Konaklı (former Adagüme) is a town in Ödemiş district of İzmir Province, Turkey. The population or Konaklı is 1906 as of 2011. Konaklı was declared a seat of township in 1960. The main agricultural crops are fruits and vegetables. Sericulture is a relatively new activity.

References

Populated places in İzmir Province
Towns in Turkey
Ödemiş District